William Jonet, of Hereford and 'Hulle' near Clifford, Herefordshire, was an English politician.

He was a Member (MP) of the Parliament of England for Hereford in 1381, February 1388 and September 1388.

References

Year of birth missing
Year of death missing
English MPs 1381
People from Hereford
English MPs February 1388
English MPs September 1388